Michael "Mike" Evans (born March 26, 1960) is an American water polo Hall of Fame member.

Born in Fontana, California, he attended University of California, Irvine, where he was an All-American in 1982 and 1983.

We was named a National Team member in 1985. He won a silver medal in the 1988 Summer Olympic Games. Evans was a member of the only United States World Cup Champion team in 1991. In 2001, he was inducted into the USA Water Polo Hall of Fame.

See also
 List of Olympic medalists in water polo (men)

References

External links
 
 Mike Evans bio at Water Polo Guide

1960 births
Living people
American male water polo players
UC Irvine Anteaters men's water polo players
Medalists at the 1988 Summer Olympics
Olympic silver medalists for the United States in water polo
Water polo players at the 1988 Summer Olympics
American water polo coaches